Sathyabhama may refer to:
Sathyabhama (1963 film), Malayalam film
Sathyabhama (2007 film), Telugu film